Anastasia Trusova (Russian: Анастасия Трусова; born 1989) is a Russian model and beauty pageant titleholder. She was crowned Miss Earth Russia 2014 on a nationwide pageant in  Anastasia became the first Russian delegate to get an elemental crown. In 2010, Victoria Shchukina assumed the Miss Earth - Air title as the original winner resigned.

Pageantry

The Beauty of Russia 2013
Anastasia won over 50 candidates for the title Beauty of Russia - Krasa Rossii. She was crowned in Moscow, Russia's music hall.

Miss Earth 2014
On November 29, 2014, Anastasia was chosen as Miss Earth - Fire in Miss Earth 2014 in the Philippines.

External links
 Russia at Miss Earth Website
Miss Earth Russia 2014 Eco-Beauty Video

References

Russian beauty pageant winners
Miss Earth 2014 contestants
Living people
1989 births